Harriet Auber (4 October 1773 — 20 January 1862) was an English poet and hymnist. She is best remembered for her collection The Spirit of the Psalms, published in 1829, and for her hymn "Our blest Redeemer, ere he breathed," a treatise on the Holy Spirit and his work.

Early years
Henriette ("Harriet") Auber was born in Spitalfields, London, on 4 October 1773. Her actual name was Henriette, but she was known as Harriet. She was the daughter of James Auber, of Hackney, a Church of England clergyman. The family was of French Protestant extraction, and probably of the same lineage with the musical composer, Daniel Francois Esprit Auber.

Career
Auber lived in a quiet and secluded home, first at Broxbourne, and then at Hoddesdon, Hertfordshire, with her sisters. She occupied much of her time in poetic composition, most of which remained unpublished. She had a large circle of relatives and friends.

In 1829 The Spirit of the Psalms; or, a Compressed Version of Select Portions of the Psalms of David was published at London anonymously. Several of these Psalms were transferred to the Church Psalmody, Boston, 1831, and other collections, where they were credited to the Spirit of the Psalms. In 1834, Rev. Henry Francis Lyte's book appeared, also entitled The Spirit of the Psalms. Led simply by the title, and not aware that the two books were entirely different, or that there were two books of the same name, subsequent compilers credited these hymns to Rev. Lyte. However, the earlier work was the production of Auber, published when she was 56. It contains a few selections from well-known authors, to some of which the names are attached; the larger part of the pieces, however, were written by Auber.

Later years
She had a valued friend in the authoress of a tale, called “Private Life,” and of “Lectures on the Parables,” and of “Lectures on the Miracles,” Miss Mary Jane McKenzie, who lived with Auber during many of the latter years of her life. Auber died on 20 January 1862, at the age of 88, at her residence in Hoddesdon, Hertfordshire. She was buried there beside McKenzie, whom she had survived a few years.

References

Bibliography

External links

 

1773 births
1862 deaths
19th-century English women writers
19th-century English writers
19th-century English poets
People from Spitalfields
English women poets
Victorian women writers
British women hymnwriters